Ray Brown Thomas (April 11, 1884 – August 5, 1931) was an American college athlete, coach of college football and college basketball, physician, and medical officer in the United States Army.

Biography
Thomas graduated from Burlington High School in Vermont, then Brown University in Rhode Island, and later earned his medical degree at the University of Vermont in 1910. While at Brown, he played football, baseball, and basketball; he also played football at Vermont.

Thomas served as the head football coach at Vermont in 1909 and at New Hampshire College of Agriculture and the Mechanic Arts for the 1910 and 1911 seasons, compiling a career college football record of 7–10–4.  Thomas was also the head basketball coach at New Hampshire for one season, in 1910–11, tallying a mark of 6–3.

In 1911, he opened a medical office in Enosburgh, Vermont. During World War I, he served as a major in the U.S. Army Medical Corps, and was chief of X-ray services at the Camp McClellan hospital in Alabama. Thomas died in August 1931 at the age of 47, of pneumonia brought on by heat stroke while on duty with the Army Reserve. He was a Freemason and a member of the Episcopal Church; he was survived by his wife, Elizabeth Laird Thomas.

Head coaching record

Football

Notes

References

External links
 

1884 births
1931 deaths
American football centers
Brown Bears football players
Brown Bears baseball players
Brown Bears men's basketball players
New Hampshire Wildcats football coaches
New Hampshire Wildcats men's basketball coaches
Vermont Catamounts football coaches
Vermont Catamounts football players
American Freemasons
United States Army personnel of World War I
United States Army Medical Corps officers
Players of American football from Vermont
Coaches of American football from Vermont
Baseball players from Vermont
Basketball coaches from Vermont
20th-century American Episcopalians
Deaths from pneumonia in Vermont
Burlington High School (Vermont) alumni